The 1982–83 FA Trophy was the fourteenth season of the FA Trophy.

Preliminary round

Ties

Replays

First qualifying round

Ties

Replays

2nd replay

Second qualifying round

Ties

Replays

Third qualifying round

Ties

Replays

2nd replay

1st round
The teams that given byes to this round are Enfield, Runcorn, Telford United, Worcester City, Dagenham, Northwich Victoria, Scarborough, Barrow, Weymouth, Boston United, Altrincham, Bath City, Yeovil Town, Stafford Rangers, Wealdstone, Nuneaton Borough, Bangor City, Dartford, Bishop's Stortford, Wycombe Wanderers, Marine, Blyth Spartans, Mossley, Sutton United, Woking, Ashington, Hastings United, Aylesbury United, Slough Town, Kidderminster Harriers, Leytonstone Ilford and Bishop Auckland.

Ties

Replays

2nd round

Ties

Replays

2nd replay

3rd round

Ties

Replays

2nd replays

4th round

Ties

Replay

Semi finals

First leg

Second leg

Final

References

General
 Football Club History Database: FA Trophy 1982-83

Specific

1982–83 domestic association football cups
League
1982-83